SFI may refer to:

Organisations
 Santa Fe Institute, a theoretical research institute located in Santa Fe, US
 Saturday Football International, Taiwanese football club
 Science Foundation Ireland, the statutory body in the Republic of Ireland for funding basic science research
 Seattle Film Institute, a film school
 Software Freedom International, a US non-profit company that coordinates Software Freedom Day
 St. Francis Institution, a school in Melaka, Malaysia
 STARFLEET: The International Star Trek Fan Association, Inc.
 Students' Federation of India, a left wing student organisation in India
 Sustainable Forestry Initiative, a forest certification standard and program of SFI Inc.
 Swedish Film Institute, for the Swedish film industry
 Swedish for immigrants, the national free Swedish language course
 Swimming Federation of India, the national governing body for aquatic sports in India
 Swiss Finance Institute, a Swiss research and scientific educational institute in the areas of banking and finance
 SFI Foundation (formerly SEMA Foundation), an organization administering equipment standards for motor sport

Technology
 Sequential fuel injection system
 SerDes Framer Interface, a standard for telecommunications
 Simple Firmware Interface, Intel's lightweight method for firmware to export static tables to the operating system
 Small form-factor pluggable transceiver, a kind of interface for a high-speed computer network
 Solar Flux Index, measure of solar radio flux per unit frequency

Transportation
 Secure Freight Initiative, a US Department of Homeland Security program
 SFI Coding and Classification System, for ship information